Fox Lake may refer to:

Inhabited places

Canada
 Fox Lake, Alberta, an unincorporated community in northern Alberta
 Fox Lake (Devon), a lake in Halifax Regional Municipality, Nova Scotia
 Fox Lake (Goffs), a lake in Halifax Regional Municipality, Nova Scotia
 Fox Lake (Lunenburg), a lake in the Municipal District Of Lunenburg, in Nova Scotia
 Fox Lake (Timberlea), a lake of Halifax Regional Municipality, Nova Scotia

United States
Fox Lake, Illinois, a village in Lake and McHenry Counties, Illinois
Fox Lake Hills, Illinois, a census-designated place in Lake County, Illinois
Fox Lake (Angola, Indiana), a national historic district in Steuben County, Indiana
Fox Lake, Minnesota, an unincorporated community in Martin County, Minnesota
Fox Lake Township, Minnesota, in Martin County, Minnesota
Fox Lake, Montana, a census-designated place in Richland County, Montana
Fox Lake Wildlife Area, in Athens County, Ohio
Fox Lake, Wisconsin, a city in Dodge County, Wisconsin
Fox Lake (town), Wisconsin, a town in Dodge County, Wisconsin

Lakes

In the United States
Fox Lake (Florida), a lake in Highlands County, Florida
Lake Fox, a lake in Polk County, Florida
Fox Lake, part of the Chain O'Lakes in Lake and McHenry Counties, Illinois
Fox Lake, a Muskegon County, Michigan
Fox Lake (Martin County, Minnesota), a lake in Martin County, Minnesota
Fox Lake, a Murray County, Minnesota
Fox Lake, a Rice County, Minnesota
Fox Lake, a Richland County, Montana
Fox Lake (Beadle County, South Dakota), Beadle County, South Dakota
Fox Lake (Deuel County, South Dakota), Deuel County, South Dakota
Fox Lake (Wisconsin), a lake in Dodge County, Wisconsin

Other lakes
Fox Lake (Cochrane District), a lake in the Cochrane District, Ontario
Fox Lake (Kings County), a lake in Kings County, Nova Scotia,
Fox Sagar Lake, a lake in Hyderabad, India

Other uses
Fox Hill Lake, a park in Bowie, Maryland
Fox Lake (Metra station), a station on Metra's Milwaukee District/North Line in Fox Lake, Illinois
Fox Lake Cree Nation, a First Nations government in Manitoba